, better known by her stage name AKINO, is an American-born Japanese pop singer, from Utah and Mesa, Arizona.

History
Originally debuting in 2003 with her brothers Akashi and Aiki and her sister Kanasa in the band bless4, Akino made her solo debut in 2005 with the singles "Genesis of Aquarion" and "Go Tight", the opening themes of the anime series Genesis of Aquarion composed by Yoko Kanno.

In 2006, Akino released "A Chance to Shine", the opening theme for the anime series Oban Star-Racers.

In 2012, she released other singles under Yoko Kanno's composition, including "Kimi no Shinwa ~ Aquarion Dai 2 Shou" and "Paradoxical ZOO", the opening themes for the anime series Aquarion Evol.

In 2014, Akino and bless4 released "Extra Magic Hour", the opening theme for the anime series Amagi Brilliant Park, and in 2015, released "Miiro", the opening theme for the anime series Kantai Collection, based on the game of the same name by Kadokawa Games.

In 2016, Akino and bless4 released "Golden Life", the first opening theme for the anime series Active Raid, and "Cross the Line" the opening theme for the anime series Izetta: The Last Witch.

In 2022, Akino was featured as the vocalist for the song "Scream" which was released as BGM for two fights in the Pandemonium Abyssos raid series of Final Fantasy XIV.

Discography

Singles
 - April 27, 2005
"Go Tight!" - August 24, 2005
"Genesis of Aquarion" & "Go Tight!"- August 24, 2011 (re-release)
 - February 15, 2012
"Extra Magic Hour" - 2014
"Jet Coaster Ride" - 2014
"Miiro" - 2015
"Just Moving On Now" - 2015
"Golden Life" - 2016
"Cross the Line" - 2016

Albums
Lost in Time - November 7, 2007
Includes "Chance To Shine" (Ōban Star-Racers Japanese opening) and 
Decennia - March 25, 2015
your ears, our years - March 24, 2021
Album spans 3 discs and has 37 songs. There is also an edition that comes with a Blu-ray Disc.

Genesis of Aquarion soundtracks
Genesis of Aquarion: Original Soundtrack - June 8, 2005
Includes  & 
Genesis of Aquarion: Original Soundtrack 2 - September 22, 2005
Includes the insert songs  and "Genesis of Aquarion" (English version of "Sōsei no Aquarion")

Aquarion Evol soundtracks
Aquarion Evol: Psalms of Eve - May 23, 2012
Includes  and 
Aquarion Evol: Love@New Dimension - July 25, 2012
Includes  and

References

External links
bless4 official web site
Akino's profile on the bless4 website 
Genesis of Aquarion discography
Victor Entertainment Artist page

1989 births
American women pop singers
American musicians of Japanese descent
American people of Okinawan descent
Anime singers
Japanese women musicians
Japanese women pop singers
Japanese Latter Day Saints
Living people
Musicians from Okinawa Prefecture
Singers from Utah
21st-century Japanese singers
21st-century American women singers
21st-century American singers
American women musicians of Japanese descent

Japanese mezzo-sopranos
American mezzo-sopranos